Shorea lepidota (called, along with some other species in the genus Shorea, light red meranti) is a species of plant in the family Dipterocarpaceae. It is native to Sumatra and Peninsular Malaysia.

References

lepidota
Trees of Sumatra
Trees of Peninsular Malaysia
Taxonomy articles created by Polbot